El Ikhwa Islands ( lit. islands of brotherhood), commonly known as Brothers Islands, are two small Red Sea islands in the Red Sea Governorate of Egypt.

Geography

The most prominent feature of the islands is the Brothers Islands Lighthouse built by the British in 1883.

Underwater diving
The islands are a dive site featuring corals and two wrecks: Numidia and Aida. The islands are also famed for encounters with oceanic whitetip and hammerhead sharks. However, they are only suitable for very experienced divers due to the islands' isolated position, the challenging dive conditions, and very strong currents.
During high season there are many dive safari boats around both islands.

In 2012, Jade Bremner ranked Big Brother ninth in a list of the world's 50 best dive sites, and second in the Red Sea.

References 

Islands of Egypt
Islands of the Red Sea
Red Sea Governorate
Underwater diving sites in Egypt